Kuch Smiles Ho Jayein... With Alia is an Indian comedy series which was made at home during the lockdown. It was created by Aayush Agrawal during the 2020 COVID-19 quarantine, it was completely shot remotely, edited and aired on Sony SAB. It was hosted by Alia Anusha Mishra from Tera Kya Hoga Alia and Balraj Syal from Apna News Aayega. The series ended on 1 June 2020 after five episodes.

Plot 
Alia started a show with her friend Balraj to entertain the viewers who miss new TV shows during the quarantine. It is a game show in which Alia and Balraj connect with the characters of Sony SAB and play fun games. Alia and Balraj invited the star cast of Sony SAB's Tera Kya Hoga Alia, Tenali Rama, Baalveer Returns, Bhakharwadi, Aladdin - Naam Toh Suna Hoga, Apna News Aayega- Naya Season and Maddam Sir.

Cast

Main

Guest

Episode 1

Episode 2

Episode 3

Episode 4

Episode 5

Tracklist

References 

Sony SAB original programming
Indian reality television series
2020 Indian television series debuts
2020 Indian television series endings
Indian comedy television series
Hindi-language television shows